Zavinaq (also Romanized as Z̄avīnaq; also known as Zavanaq, Zavanīq, Zavnīq, Zoonaq, Zūneh, and Zvina) is a village in Sojas Rud Rural District, Sojas Rud District, Khodabandeh County, Zanjan Province, Iran. At the 2006 census, its population was 442, in 92 families.

References 

Populated places in Khodabandeh County